The term wildlife trust can be used in one of two senses to describe organisations concerned with wildlife:

 in a specific sense, to refer to the Royal Society of Wildlife Trusts in the United Kingdom, or one of its constituent members known as The Wildlife Trusts; a list of these can be found at that page.
 in a more generic sense to refer to a charitable organisation whose aims relate to wildlife (usually wildlife conservation, but also education); a (very incomplete) list of these is below.

Wildlife trusts (other than those that are part of the UK movement The Wildlife Trusts):

 Wildlife Trust (US) — a US-based organisation 
 Endangered Wildlife Trust 
 The Irish Wildlife Trust
 The Vincent Wildlife Trust
 The David Sheldrick Wildlife Trust
 Wildlife Trust of India 
 Okavango People's Wildlife Trust
 Northmoor Trust